Calhoun is an unincorporated community in Barbour County in the U.S. state of West Virginia.

References

Unincorporated communities in Barbour County, West Virginia
Unincorporated communities in West Virginia